Raegan J. Higgins is an American mathematician and co-director of the EDGE program for Women. She is also one of the co-founders of the website Mathematically Gifted & Black, which highlights the accomplishments of Black mathematicians.

Research
Higgins studies time scales and its application to mathematical biology.

Education
Higgins went to Xavier University of Louisiana in New Orleans, Louisiana. She attended University of Nebraska-Lincoln for her graduate studies studying under the advisement of Lynn Erbe and Allan Clemens Peterson.  She graduated in 2008 and was one of the first two African-American women to earn a doctoral degree in Mathematics from University of Nebraska-Lincoln.

Career
Higgins, along with Ami Radunskaya, is co-director of the EDGE program which supports women who are pursuing graduate degrees and ultimately careers in the mathematical sciences. She participated in the EDGE program in 2002 as a graduate student. She was also a workshop facilitator from 2014 to 2017. Professor Higgins became Co-Director of the program in 2017.

In 2008, Higgins joined the faculty at Texas Tech University in the Department of Mathematics & Statistics. She earned tenure and was promoted to Associate Professor, becoming the first African American to receive Tenure and Promotion in the Mathematics & Statistics Department at Texas Tech.

Honors and Grant Awards
In 2020, Higgins received the Association for Women in Mathematics (AWM) service award. She has won several National Science Foundation grants for various programs in mathematical education. She also earned the 2021 AWM Gweneth Humphreys Award. She co-delivered an invited plenary address at the 2021 National Math Festival.

Higgins' accomplishments earned her recognition by Mathematically Gifted & Black as a Black History Month 2018 Honoree.

References

External links 

 Home page
 Video interview at Meet a Mathematician!

Living people
21st-century American mathematicians
Women mathematicians
African-American mathematicians
American women mathematicians
Year of birth missing (living people)
21st-century American women
21st-century African-American women
21st-century African-American people